Robert Hazen Palmer (born October 2, 1952, in Detroit, Michigan) is a former professional ice hockey player who played 16 games in the National Hockey League.  He played for the Chicago Black Hawks.

He played his college hockey at the University of Denver, where he was an all-American.

Awards and honors

References

External links 

1952 births
Living people
AHCA Division I men's ice hockey All-Americans
American men's ice hockey forwards
Chicago Blackhawks draft picks
Chicago Blackhawks players
Dallas Black Hawks players
Denver Pioneers men's ice hockey players
Fort Worth Texans players
Ice hockey people from Detroit